Sorption is a physical and chemical process by which one substance becomes attached to another. Specific cases of sorption are treated in the following articles:
 Absorption "the incorporation of a substance in one state into another of a different state" (e.g., liquids being absorbed by a solid or gases being absorbed by a liquid);
 Adsorption The physical adherence or bonding of ions and molecules onto the surface of another phase (e.g., reagents adsorbed to a solid catalyst surface);
 Ion exchange An exchange of ions between two electrolytes or between an electrolyte solution and a complex.

The reverse of sorption is desorption.

Sorption rate
The adsorption and absorption rate of a diluted solute in gas or liquid solution to a surface or interface can be calculated using Fick's laws of diffusion.

See also
 Sorption isotherm

References

Physical chemistry